The unexpected hanging paradox or surprise test paradox is a paradox about a person's expectations about the timing of a future event which they are told will occur at an unexpected time. The paradox is variously applied to a prisoner's hanging or a surprise school test. It was first introduced to the public in Martin Gardner's March 1963 Mathematical Games column in Scientific American magazine.

There is no consensus on its precise nature and consequently a canonical resolution has not been agreed on. Logical analyses focus on "truth values", for example by identifying it as paradox of self-reference. Epistemological studies of the paradox instead focus on issues relating to knowledge; for example, one interpretation reduces it to Moore's paradox. Some regard it as a "significant problem" for philosophy.

Description 
The paradox has been described as follows:

Other versions of the paradox replace the death sentence with a surprise fire drill, examination, pop quiz, A/B test launch, a lion behind a door, or a marriage proposal before moving to Seattle.

Logical school
Formulation of the judge's announcement into formal logic is made difficult by the vague meaning of the word "surprise". An attempt at formulation might be:

The prisoner will be hanged next week and the date (of the hanging) will not be deducible the night before from the assumption that the hanging will occur during the week (A).

Given this announcement the prisoner can deduce that the hanging will not occur on the last day of the week. However, in order to reproduce the next stage of the argument, which eliminates the penultimate day of the week, the prisoner must argue that his ability to deduce, from statement (A), that the hanging will not occur on the last day, implies that a second-to-last-day hanging would not be surprising. But since the meaning of "surprising" has been restricted to not deducible from the assumption that the hanging will occur during the week instead of not deducible from statement (A), the argument is blocked.

This suggests that a better formulation would in fact be:

The prisoner will be hanged next week and its date will not be deducible the night before using this statement as an axiom (B).

Fitch has shown that this statement can still be expressed in formal logic. Using an equivalent form of the paradox which reduces the length of the week to just two days, he proved that although self-reference is not illegitimate in all circumstances, it is in this case because the statement is self-contradictory.

Epistemological school
Various epistemological formulations have been proposed that show that the prisoner's tacit assumptions about what he will know in the future, together with several plausible assumptions about knowledge, are inconsistent.

Chow (1998) provides a detailed analysis of a version of the paradox in which a surprise hanging is to take place on one of two days.  Applying Chow's analysis to the case of the unexpected hanging (again with the week shortened to two days for simplicity), we start with the observation that the judge's announcement seems to affirm three things:

 S1: The hanging will occur on Monday or Tuesday.
 S2: If the hanging occurs on Monday, then the prisoner will not know on Sunday evening that it will occur on Monday.
 S3: If the hanging occurs on Tuesday, then the prisoner will not know on Monday evening that it will occur on Tuesday.

As a first step, the prisoner reasons that a scenario in which the hanging occurs on Tuesday is impossible because it leads to a contradiction: on the one hand, by S3, the prisoner would not be able to predict the Tuesday hanging on Monday evening; but on the other hand, by S1 and process of elimination, the prisoner would be able to predict the Tuesday hanging on Monday evening.

Chow's analysis points to a subtle flaw in the prisoner's reasoning.  What is impossible is not a Tuesday hanging.  Rather, what is impossible is a situation in which the hanging occurs on Tuesday despite the prisoner knowing on Monday evening that the judge's assertions S1, S2, and S3 are all true.

The prisoner's reasoning, which gives rise to the paradox, is able to get off the ground because the prisoner tacitly assumes that on Monday evening, he will (if he is still alive) know S1, S2, and S3 to be true.  This assumption seems unwarranted on several different grounds.  It may be argued that the judge's pronouncement that something is true can never be sufficient grounds for the prisoner knowing that it is true.  Further, even if the prisoner knows something to be true in the present moment, unknown psychological factors may erase this knowledge in the future.  Finally, Chow suggests that because the statement which the prisoner is supposed to "know" to be true is a statement about his inability to "know" certain things, there is reason to believe that the unexpected hanging paradox is simply a more intricate version of Moore's paradox.  A suitable analogy can be reached by reducing the length of the week to just one day. Then the judge's sentence becomes: You will be hanged tomorrow, but you do not know that.

In literature
The paradox also appears in the children's novel More Sideways Arithmetic From Wayside School by Louis Sachar. In one of the stories, the teacher, Mrs. Jewls, plans on having a pop quiz the following week, but will not let the class know in advance. Unlike in the classic paradox, the students eliminating the days one by one causes Mrs. Jewls to abandon the idea.

See also
 Bottle Imp paradox
 Centipede game, the Nash equilibrium of which uses a similar mechanism as its proof.
 Crocodile dilemma
 Interesting number paradox
 List of paradoxes

References

Further reading

 The first appearance of the paradox in print. The author claims that certain contingent future tense statements cannot come true.
  The author argues that a surprise exam (or unexpected hanging) can indeed take place on the last day of the period and therefore that the very first premise that launches the paradox is, despite first appearances, simply false.
 The author critiques O'Connor and discovers the paradox as we know it today.
 The author claims that the prisoner's premises are self-referring.
 The first complete formalization of the paradox, and a proposed solution to it.
 A history and bibliography of writings on the paradox up to 1983.
 The author claims that the prisoner assumes, falsely, that if he knows some proposition, then he also knows that he knows it.
 The author defends and extends Wright and Sudbury's solution. He also updates the history and bibliography of Margalit and Bar-Hillel up to 1991.
 English translation.
 Completely analyzes the paradox and introduces other situations with similar logic.

External links
"The Surprise Examination Paradox and the Second Incompleteness Theorem" by Shira Kritchman and Ran Raz, at ams.org
"The Surprise Examination Paradox: A review of two so-called solutions in dynamic epistemic logic" by Alexandru Marcoci, at Faculty of Science: University of Amsterdam
"Jethro On Death Row": a song based on this paradox, composed and performed by Simon Beck

Logical paradoxes
Works about prisons
Hanging
1963 introductions